Polícia do Exército may refer to:

A type of Military Police:
Army Police (Brazil)
Army Police (Portugal)

See also
 Military Police